Agirda is a Turkish Cypriot village in the Kyrenia District of Cyprus.  It is under the de facto control of Northern Cyprus. Its population in 2011 was 745.

References

Communities in Kyrenia District
Populated places in Girne District